Allan Edward Geddes (4 November 1903 – 12 December 1987) was an Australian rules football player who played between 1922 and 1924 in the VFA for the Williamstown Football Club, and in the VFL between 1925 and 1935 for the Richmond Football Club.

VFA
He played with the VFA club Williamstown from 1922 to 1924, playing 51 games and scoring seven goals.

He also played one game for a combined VFA team that played against a Perth Football Club team, at the North Melbourne Cricket Ground on 2 August 1924; In a low scoring match, played in appalling conditions, the Perth team won by two points: 3.8 (26) to 3.6 (24). Geddes was one of Victoria's best players.

VFL (Firsts)

He was cleared from Williamstown to Richmond on 1 May 1925, and played on the wing in his first match for Richmond in round one of the 1925 season, against the Hawthorn Football Club, at Glenferrie Oval on 2 May 1925 (the Hawthorn Club's first ever VFL match). Geddes played well in a team that beat Hawthorn 11.11 (77) to (5.9 (39).

Brownlow Medal
He was equal second, along with Geelong's Carji Greeves and Melbourne's Bob Johnson, to Ivor Warne-Smith in the 1926 Brownlow Medal.

VFL (Seconds)

Richmond
He played 45 games with the Richmond Second XVIII between 1936 and 1938. He was the team's captain/coach in 1936 and 1937, and was the team's coach in 1938 (although still playing, and still the team's coach, he was no longer its captain).

Carlton
He was the non-playing Coach of the Carlton Seconds in 1939.

After football
He was appointed as a selector for Richmond in 1940.

See also
 1927 Melbourne Carnival

Footnotes

References 
 Hogan P: The Tigers Of Old, Richmond FC, Melbourne 1996.

External links

Allan Geddes: Australianfotball.com.
Richmond Football Club - Hall of Fame
 Boyles Football Photos: Allan Geddes.
 The VFA Project: Alan (sic) Geddes.

1903 births
1987 deaths
Australian rules footballers from Melbourne
Australian Rules footballers: place kick exponents
Richmond Football Club players
Richmond Football Club Premiership players
Williamstown Football Club players
Two-time VFL/AFL Premiership players
People from North Melbourne